Rodney Gould (born 10 March 1943 in Banbury) is a British former Grand Prix motorcycle road racer and UK short circuit specialist.

Gould began racing in 1961 and made his first Isle of Man TT appearance in 1967. He rode a variety of machines including Manx Nortons and two-stroke Bultacos for the smaller classes, and was supported by UK Aermacchi concessionaire Syd Lawton from 1966, before turning to Yamaha TD2s and TR2s.

He won the 1970 FIM 250cc world championship on a Yamaha. After finishing third in the 250 class and fourth in the 500 class in 1972, Gould retired from competition and took a position as Yamaha's European racing manager.

In 1979 Gould established a retail motorcycle dealership in Birmingham (UK) named Hailwood and Gould, in partnership with famous former-racer Mike Hailwood, who was subsequently killed in a road traffic accident in 1981. In 1984, Gould was briefly Sales Manager for the second incarnation of Hesketh Motorcycles based at Lord 
Hesketh's Easton Neston stately home.

Motorcycle Grand Prix results

Points system from 1950 to 1968:

Points system from 1969 onwards:

(key) (Races in bold indicate pole position; races in italics indicate fastest lap)

References 

1943 births
Living people
Sportspeople from Banbury
British motorcycle racers
English motorcycle racers
500cc World Championship riders
350cc World Championship riders
250cc World Championship riders
125cc World Championship riders
Isle of Man TT riders
250cc World Riders' Champions